Mujtaba Hussain Siddiqui known as  Imran is an  Orator . He is the founder of Islamic Research and Educational Foundation at Hyderabad, and is rarely known to be a student of Ahmed Deedat.  Imran was inspired by Ahmed Deedat after watching his debates in Riyadh.

Early life 
Brother Imran was born and brought up in the surroundings of Himmat Pura Anand Basti, and at a very young age he has excelled in studies and attained good command over English Language.

Controversy 
Brother Imran was charged with false allegations that he made a sacrilegious remarks against the beloved grandsons of Prophet Muhammed by Shiites, he was sent to police remand and later on released after Telangana police reviewed his lecture and concluded that he did not make any statement which hurt the feelings of any sect.

References

Living people
Year of birth missing (living people)
Indian Muslims
Indian Sunni Muslims
Muslim apologetics